The Second Honduran Civil War (Spanish: Segunda guerra civil hondureña) or the Reclamation Revolution (Spanish: Revolución Reivindicatoria) was the armed conflict that took place in the Republic of Honduras in 1924. This was the first conflict in Honduras where airplanes were used for aerial bombardment, and new war tactics inherited from the First World War were employed.

Background

Post First Civil War government (1919–1924) 
General Rafael López Gutiérrez, who assumed the presidency of Honduras as a candidate for the Liberal Party of Honduras and a figure in the First Civil War of Honduras in 1919; intends to become entrenched in power, the general elections for president would normally be held in the country. The candidates were Dr. Juan Ángel Arias Boquín for the “Arismo” Movement of the Honduran Liberal Party, Dr. Policarpo Bonilla, former president of the nation and candidate of the “Constitutional Liberal Party,” and Doctor Tiburcio Carias Andino, candidate of the National Party of Honduras. López Gutiérrez, not satisfied with the results, ordered that the National Congress could not resolve by ruling in favor of the virtual winner who would be Carias Andino by obtaining the majority of votes and as the candidate of the National Party.

López attempt to stay in power 

On January 30, 1924, the settlement plan between the Liberal Party and the National Party was deemed to have failed. These conversations were known as "Plan Paz Barahona". As there was no agreement, General Tiburcio Carías and the Dr. Juan Ángel Arias and together with them the deputies in favor of the two candidates (15 Cariístas and 18 Aristas) who were to elect doctor Miguel Paz Barahona as President of the country in the National Congress of Honduras. As such, General Tiburcio Carias Andino secretly left the city of Tegucigalpa at 7:00 p.m., along with him several friends of his have left, armed, this was interpreted as the signal of war, during the same night people leave the capital to join the ranks of the newly formed "Revolution". The same January 31 was the last day of the Constitutional Government. The National Congress held a session in the afternoon, with the assistance of the Diplomatic Corps, but there is not enough quorum and the session was adjourned at 5:00 p.m. Later, another session is held, it is said that to see if a President or even a Presidential Designate can be elected at the last minute, but there is also no quorum and at 9:00 p.m. the National Congress is closed definitively, knowing of such events the General and even President Rafael López Gutiérrez proclaimed himself dictator on February 1, 1924.2

The opponents of both the Liberal Party and the National Party see López Gutiérrez as a threat to democracy in Honduras and national security, since the General commands and manages the Armed Forces of Honduras at will, on February 1, 1924 they leave bound for the Republic of El Salvador important social, political and executive personalities of Honduras, among them the businessman Don Santos Soto Rosales and family, at that time the richest Honduran; Engineer Héctor Medina Planas, Attorney José María Matute, Mr. Raúl Toledo López who had resigned from the position of Military Commander and Political Governor of Tegucigalpa, Mr. F. Alfredo Medrano, Mr. Guillermo Moncada R., General Dionisio Gutiérrez who He had resigned from the post of Minister of War and Navy and other officers such as General Jacobo Galindo, General Joaquín Medina Planas, General Ramón Alvarado Mendieta, Colonel Ricardo Lardizábal, among many others, due to the fact that the place of "San Juancito" A strong contingent of revolutionary troops has been present under the command of General J. Innocente Triminio Osorio, who left Tegucigalpa on the night of the 30th and had gathered a group of three hundred followers of the Barrio Viera.

Previously, in 1920, the Honduran government had been fascinated by the power of the air armed wing, which had its scenarios in the First World War, which is why it bought its first British aircraft, a Bristol F.2B registered H-9.3 Likewise, more aircraft were acquired between 1921 and 1923 which were fundamental pieces in this new civil war. Meanwhile, López Gutiérrez declares a "state of siege" and mobilizes his troops.

International reaction 
On February 27, days after the war began, the governments of China, Spain, France, the United Kingdom, and Italy demanded the United States government to protect its citizens living in Honduras. At the time the country experienced an economic boom that led many Chinese, European (Spaniards, French, Italian, Jewish), and Arab immigrants to arrive to Honduras. Northern Honduras regions had a multitude of English speaking communities. Because of this, the United States played a role during the war by sending in warships.

Movements

Western Honduras 
February 3. General Vicente Tosta Carrasco and General Gregorio Ferrera take the town square of Marcala for the revolution and march towards the west of the country.

Central Honduras 
February 4, General Mariano Bertrand Anduray in command of 300 men, has taken the Plaza of the city of Siguatepeque.

Northern Honduras 
February 4. Yoro Square is attacked by a revolutionary force under the command of Colonel Abraham López and Colonel Emeterio Rivera; In the bulk of the combat, several men died, including Colonel López and Colonel Timoteo Reyes, when they were reduced after three hours of intense fire, the rebels have withdrawn.

Proclamation of the revolution to the dictator 
February 5. In the town of "Las Manos" near the border with the Republic of Nicaragua, the General Staff of the Constitutional Army issues a statement for the dictator, General Rafael López Gutiérrez, in which they support the doctor and General Tiburcio Carias Andino, as President of Honduras and elected by the people, in this sense calling for war.

The Honduran government asks for financial aid

February 5. The Minister of the Interior and Justice, Dr. José Ángel Zúñiga Huete, asks businessmen, bankers and other Honduran and foreign merchants for the sum of US$200,000 dollars in order to crush the proclaimed revolution and lift the country, some of them refused to grant loans and a few others voluntarily gave money. The ambassador of the United States of America Mr. Franklin E. Morales leaves Tegucigalpa, destined to meet with Carias Andino and propose a solution.

Western Honduras 
February 7. The colonial city of Gracias falls into the hands of the rebel forces under the command of General Vicente Tosta Carrasco, General Gregorio Ferrera. Those who continue to Santa Rosa.

Battle of Jacaleapa 
February 9. The battle fought in the town of Jacaleapa, near the Nicaraguan border, between the revolutionary forces and the dictatorial forces, under the command of Generals Sánchez, Teófilo Cárcamo known as "Tencaramo", Cámbar, Fonseca and Mejía. Although details are lacking, it is known that there have been many deaths and injuries, and General Cárcamo has been wounded and a prisoner in the hands of the Revolution. The forces of the Revolution have had to withdraw due to lack of ammunition to continue fighting. Among the heads of the revolutionary forces were officers General José Innocente Triminio and General Camilo R. Reina Rivera, officers Colonel Pedro Francisco Triminio, Colonel Constantino S. Ramos, Colonel Manuel Valladares Núñez, Colonel Ricardo Lozano, Colonel Armando B. Reina, and others. In the thick of the battle the revolutionaries have done feats of courage and recklessness. Colonel Armando B. Reina has been mortally wounded in the fighting, when he threw himself on a machine gun of the dictatorial forces. Colonel Pedro Francisco Triminio has been seriously wounded, Colonel Ricardo Lozano has received four bullets that have left him in serious condition, despite their inferior weapons, the revolutionary forces are in good shape.

Western Honduran front 
Feb. 10. The Plaza of the city of Santa Rosa de Copán is taken at the hands of the rebel forces under the command of General Vicente Tosta Carrasco and General Gregorio Ferrera. The Plaza of the city of Ocotepeque voluntarily joined the revolutionaries.

Central Honduras 
Feb. 10. Honduran government espionage detects that in the vicinity of the town of Lamaní, there is a rebel barracks with 2,000 men ready to take Tegucigalpa under the command of General Bertrand Anduray. The ruler López Gutiérrez sends forces to the outskirts of the capital, placing machine guns and cannons on the Cerro "el Picacho", the hill "el Berrinche", the hill "Sipile" and the hill "Juan A. Laínez" in order to protect and detain an attack.

Northwest

February 13. The city of Santa Bárbara falls, without much resistance to the rebel generals Tosta Carrasco and Ferrera. General Tosta continued through the Valleys of Quimistan in order to reach San Pedro Sula.

Eastern Honduran front 
February 13. The city of San Marcos de Colón is attacked by the rebels under the command of General Francisco Martínez Fúnez, around 45 were killed, the garrison in the Plaza resisted and repelled the attack, the rebels fled to the border with Nicaragua.

Puerto Cortes

The USS "Rochester" cruiser of the US Navy is anchored in Puerto Cortés awaiting orders.

Southern Honduras 
February 14. The American cruiser USS "Milwaukee", of 7,200 tons and 110,000 horsepower, has anchored in the Amapala bay.

18 February. General Leonardo Nuila has recovered the square of the city of La Paz, after a short shootout against the revolutionary forces under the command of Colonel Moisés Nazar, who the next day, in a counterattack

Battle of "El Pedregalito" 
February 20. The government troops under the command of General Peralta arrive at night at the place "Alauca", four leagues from "Pedregalito" and "Sabana Redonda", where General Tiburcio Carías Andino is with his army. At about 5:00 a.m., a fierce combat began that lasted all day, from which many dead and wounded on both sides have emerged. The revolutionaries despite their dangerous shortage of ammunition, sustained the long and continuous fire of the government army. Among the revolutionary leaders were General José Innocente Triminio, General Mariano Sanabria and General Camilo R. Reina, and Colonel Pedro Triminio, Colonel Calixto Carías, Colonel Constantino S. Ramos, Colonel Manuel Valladares Núñez and others. Colonel Carías was seriously wounded. After the battle, and due to lack of a park and sufficient weapons, the revolutionary forces had to withdraw from the site, taking the dictatorial forces.

Battle of Comayagua 
February 21. General Gregorio Ferrera attacked in the early hours and by surprise the Plaza of the colonial city and former capital of Comayagua, the government commander has ordered the counteroffensive. February 22. They continue fighting fiercely in the city and surroundings, General Ferrera's forces are gaining ground. On February 23, after two days and one night of terrible fighting, Comayagua has fallen into the power of the revolutionary army headed by General Gregorio Ferrera, the informative part also assures that the Commander and Dr. José María Ochoa Velásquez, former vice president of the nation and Colonel Salomón Sorto Z., who were defending the town hall and the plaza, have escaped unharmed and fled to Tegucigalpa, Colonel José María Navas Gardela, died in combat.

Center 
26 of February. The "Gutierrista" government sent a strong contingent to the town of "Zambrano" with orders to stop General Ferrera's advance on the capital. The day after, on (February 27), more troops leave for “Zambrano”. The Military Red Cross is organized.

North Coast 
General Vicente Tosta Carrasco met in Buffalo with the officials of the government troops that were defending San Pedro Sula, as there was no surrender agreement for the latter and the threat that said forces would attack the revolutionaries of Tosta. 27 February, the governmental General Carlos Lagos, commanding 6,000 men, plans the attack on the 2,000 rebels commanded by General Vicente Tosta Carrasco -a military academy- who devised the following strategy: He left in "Calpules" around 60 men and flags with the In order to deceive the enemy, meanwhile he with the bulk of his forces moved by forced march to the heights where he could dominate the site, and attack the "gutierrista" troops in an enveloping movement, in effect, at 8:00 am the forces Dictatorials attacked the diminished revolutionary positions located in “Calpules” (Agua Prieta), assaulting and taking them without any apparent difficulty. At that time, General Tosta ordered the attack on his army, surprising the officers and enemy troops, the fight spread through "Trinchera" (Choloma) where Colonel "Chicho" Matute lost his life, in "Cerro Will", " Cofradía ”,“ Palmar ”and“ Choloma ”, are fought hard for three days (February 27, 28 and 29), the dictatorial Army gradually loses ground, until, realizing that it had lost the battle and seeing itself in danger of being completely annihilated, he began to retreat to the northwest, leaving San Pedro Sula at the mercy of the Revolution, the defeated officers were: Carlos Lagos, Salvador Cisneros, Luis Mejía Moreno, Gonzalo Navarro and José María Escoto in whom the dictator Rafael López Gutiérrez had a lot of faith .

February 28. In the city of La Ceiba there is another meeting between the government and revolutionary forces, all due to the fact that the banana transnational United Fruit Company gave its support to Doctor and General Tiburcio Carias Andino. On March 1, the squares of the port city of Tela also fell. The United States breaks diplomatic relations with Honduras and sends the USS Denver6 to the shores of the Honduran Caribbean, to safeguard its own interests.

San Pedro Sula 
March 3. General Vicente Tosta Carrasco enters the city of San Pedro Sula in triumph and without any opposition. General Gregorio Ferrera, then marched towards the center of the country to attack the cities of Siguatepeque and Zambrano

Battle of Zambrano 
In March 4 the battle of Zambrano took place between government forces and those of General Ferrera. The revolutionaries triumphed and the army had to hastily retreat to the capital,abandoning a cannon and many supplies. Giving an account of this combat, General Ferrera says: 

“Yesterday, at 4:30 p.m., we suddenly collided with a strongly entrenched enemy in these fields. Our cavalry was surprised and almost defeated; but was immediately supported by the brave colonels Cristóbal Gutiérrez, Pedro G. Domínguez, Fulgencio Machado and Blas Domínguez. The gunfire started with extreme violence. At 5:30 it was ordered to Colonels Pragedes García and Juan Z. Pérez an attack from our right, which was done with energy. This attack began to make the enemy hesitate. At 7 pm, a machete charge was ordered. Thus we managed to remove from the forces of the dictatorship their first positions; but the fight continue dduring the night and hopefully it varied until today at 8 in the morning, which we definitely succeed. One thousand three hundred men were lost, equipped with artillery, machine guns and abundant cartridges, Commanded by Generals Máximo B. Rosales, Julio Peralta, Francisco Cardona and Fonseca and several colonels who constantly received aid in men and weapons from the capital. We captured 2 Thompson machine guns and part of the war train .Among our dead is the ill-fated Colonel Cristóbal Gutiérrez, and Colonels Machado and Domínguez (Pedro G.) and several others whoI will nominate in due course. Our wounded have already been brought to Comayagua. The disaster of the dictatorships has been complete; but we have necessary to make great efforts, since the elements that we fight  constituted the essential and select for the Dictatorship''.

Center 
7 of March. General Ferrera has advanced with his army to the heights of the town of Santa Cruz, two leagues from the Honduran capital Tegucigalpa.

Sabotage in Tegucigalpa 
March 9, 1924. The Honduras Post Office building, the National Warehouse and the General Revenue Administration building have been destroyed by a voracious fire, allegedly caused by spies of the revolution. The representatives of the diplomatic corps of the countries with which Honduras has a relationship, order their compatriots to close their offices and protect themselves from an imminent attack on the Honduran capital. US Ambassador Franklin E. Morales requests the possible intervention of his country's military. President Woodrow Wilson orders the USS Milwaukee to be stationed in the Gulf of Fonseca. On March 11, 1924, about 200 marines disembarked, and at 11:00 hours they arrived in Tegucigalpa (110 km) and besieged it.

Ultimatum of general Gregorio Ferrera 
While an armistice was being resolved between the parties and some diplomats interested in resolving the war situation, the revolutionary general Ferrera urged the parties for an Armistice that would end on March 13 at 5:00 p.m., the Dictatorial Government did not he would resolve to hand over the Tegucigalpa plaza to the rebels; consequently, hostilities would break out and the total attack on the Honduran capital would begin.

President López Gutiérrez, leaves the administration in charge of a Council of Ministers headed by Doctor and General Francisco Bueso Cuéllar, who governs from March 10 to April 30, 1924, after which he hands over General and politician Fausto Dávila who governs from March 27 to 31. Although the doctor and general Tiburcio Carias Andino had proclaimed himself president when he took Tegucigalpa between February 9 to March 24 and from this date to April 28, 1924, in parallel to the Council of Ministers that López Gutiérrez had indicated before his departure outside Honduras and that he would find death due to his illness (diabetes mellitus) on March 10 at 4:00 p.m. The Council of Ministers that exercised the Executive Power of Honduras requested a truce from the rebels, in order to carry out the funeral of Rafael López Gutiérrez, in the General Cemetery, on Tuesday, March 11, in the afternoon.

Ferrera's ultimatum was taken seriously by the citizens of the Honduran capital who did not sleep through the night waiting for the aforementioned attack, although there was none, the rebels did prepare to the teeth to do it in a more tactical way. Meanwhile, on March 13, General Vicente Tosta Carrasco attacked La Ceiba together with General Filiberto Díaz Zelaya, the fall resulted in many deaths and injuries and a part of the city destroyed.

Aerial bombardment of the Honduran capital 

The city of Tegucigalpa became the first capital of Latin America to be bombed, the revolution had two planes of which the airmen dropped the bombs by hand, the government forces only had the Bristol plane. On April 9, the revolutionary airplane bombards the city in the morning and in the afternoon. In the morning: He has dropped four bombs on "Parque La Leona", one of them 200 meters from the British Embassy; another bomb has fallen about 25 meters from the Normal School located in the “La Alhambra” building. Other bombs have fallen in the center of the city of Tegucigalpa, two of them in the house of Ms. Prisca Ugarte, and 7 meters from the Embassy of Mexico, another 20 meters from the Embassy of Guatemala, this one killed two girls and left several women seriously injured. Likewise, two more unexploded bombs were collected, one 5 meters from Francisco Antúnez's house and another in a courtyard near the San Francisco Barracks.

Center 
General Gregorio Ferrera leaves part of his constitutional revolutionary army under the orders of the commanders of the revolution in the center and goes south to take Choluteca, Ferrera would not arrive in the city until 03:00 in the morning at the head of his army that he had no obstacles in taking the Cholutecan plaza, since the officer in charge of that place, General Toribio Ramos, had left with his 500 men and other supplies, leaving the city abandoned.

Paper bombing in the capital 
The revolutionary airplane has dropped on the city of Tegucigalpa, an endless number of flying papers addressed to the government soldiers in command of the dictatorial Government Council, in which they allude to lay down their arms, surrender or join the constitutional revolution. General Toribio Ramos enters the capital with a column of soldiers related to the dictatorial government.

Foreign diplomatic corps 
To request a total ceasefire, a negotiating body has been formed made up of diplomats accredited in the country, being the following: Franklin E. Morales, Minister Plenipotentiary and Special Envoy of the United States of America; Mr. G. Lyall, Chargé d'Affaires of England; Dr. José María Bonilla, Chargé d'Affaires of Guatemala; Dr. Pablo Campos Ortíz, Head of the Mexican Legation; Mr. Anselmo Rivas G., Minister Plenipotentiary and Envoy Extraordinary of Nicaragua and Dr. Bernardino Larios H., Chargé d'Affaires of El Salvador, the persons who will listen to the full voice of the representatives of the parties in conflict.

Request for a peace conference 

The port of the island of Amapala in southern Honduras was chosen, and summoned by the delegate for the United States of America Mr. Summer Welles, Minister Franklin Morales, General Gregorio Ferrera who has accepted the participation in the conference, they presented themselves Both parties were ready for said conference: Due to the Constitutional Revolution, the list was made up of the following personalities: Doctor Fausto Dávila, General Vicente Tosta Carrasco, Doctor Miguel Paz Barahona (already released), Doctor Silverio Laínez and Doctor José María Casco. The list presented by the Council of Ministers indicated: Doctor Francisco Bueso Cuéllar, Doctor Carlos Alberto Uclés, Doctor Federico C. Canales, Doctor and General Roque J. López and Doctor and General José María Ochoa V. Meanwhile, Doctor López has resigned from the Ministry of War and Navy to attend the Conference, and Dr. José Ángel Zúñiga Huete will be appointed Minister in his place.

Counterattack on the capital 
On April 21, heavy artillery pieces fell on the Casa Presidencial de Honduras, the Banco de Honduras S. A. building and its surroundings without causing serious damage or death.

Peace conference. On April 23, 1924, the deliberative parties were present on the USS “Milwaukee” cruiser commanded by Admiral Dayton, thus beginning negotiations between the revolutionaries and the government.

Fall of Tegucigalpa 
On April 28, the capital is taken by a brutal and numerous offensive of the revolution, this is how one of the best military tacticians in Honduras takes the city: At 9:30 p.m. the troops of the Revolution, under the immediate command of General Vicente Tosta Carrasco, they have crossed the river in front of the Manuel Bonilla National Theater, La Concordia Park and the municipal Pantheon, continuing down the “El Berrinche” and in an overwhelming avalanche towards the center of the city. The first columns of General Tosta Carrasco take over the Market, the Honduras Telegraph building and the Police headquarters. Other rebel columns penetrate the surroundings of the Pantheon, under a shower of bullets launched by machine guns from the hill “El Sipile”. General Martínez Fúnez's troops enter through the site of “Guanacaste” and through the slopes of the “Juan A. Laínez” hill, reaching the “Isla” sector and on the other side over the San Francisco Barracks. Meanwhile, a revolutionary column under the command of Colonel Carlos B. González and other leaders, attack and take the Veterans Barracks, and march on the Presidential Palace.

Appointment of new president 
On April 28 and after many talks and broken agreements, the Peace Conference reaches a key moment, a ceasefire is agreed and at around 12:30 p.m. General Vicente Tosta Carrasco is appointed as Provisional President, the same On April 30 at 10:00 a.m., he took an oath of promise to the Law before the Mayor of Tegucigalpa, then he went to the Honduran Presidential House where, as of May 1, he takes office and summons the delegations Central American countries to report the facts. Tosta Carranza performs his administrative functions lightly, on May 22 he sent a letter to the President of the United States Calvin Cooldige.

Military tactics 
The modernizatrion of the Honduran army led to new war tactics, most of them introduced thanks to the technological advances seen during the  First World War. The most notable of them, were:

 Nocturnal attacks, mostly used to attack government buildings.
 Use of the Gatling machine gun and Thompson sub rifle.
 Use of the airplane 
 The car was used for the transportation of troops
 Trenches were used to defend positions
 The participation of mercenaries from the Mexican Revolution and the First World War.

Consequences 
The war costed more than 2 million dollars in the damage of infrastructure, many historical buildings of Tegucigalpa were damaged by guns, the Market and national mail were burned to the ground. Is supposed that more than 3,000 identified soldiers were killed in battle, most of their bodies were buried in common pits, and there's a non identified number of wounded and disappeared troops, more than 50 identified civilians died during the attacks. This war costed the lose of diplomatic relations of Honduras between its neighborhoods, several other nations, and the United States. There was another military insurrection against Tosta Carrasco. All this instability gave rise to the Carias Andino Dictatorship.

See also 
 History of Honduras

References

1924 in Honduras
Wars involving Honduras
History of Honduras
Military history of Honduras
Political history of Honduras